The following is a list of Singaporean Community Development Councils from 2006 to 2011.

As of 2006, there are still five Community Development Councils throughout Singapore. However, the composition of constituencies within each CDC were changed on 31 May 2006 to reflect the changes in constituencies during the 2006 Singaporean general election.

References 

 Community Development Council